Ramotshere Moiloa Local Municipality (formerly Zeerust Local Municipality) is a local municipality in the Ngaka Modiri Molema District Municipality, North West Province, South Africa. The seat of local municipality is Zeerust.

History 
The municipality is named after Kgosi Abram Ramotshere Moiloa, a key figure in the Bahurutshe resistance of the 1950s. Kgosi Moiloa was banished by the Apartheid Government in 1957 after he refused to enforce the carrying of passbooks by Hurutshe women as obliged by apartheid law. The women of Dinokana had largely refused to carry the passbooks, and Kgosi Moiloa had supported their decision. At the first meeting held by the native commissioner, 1000 women gathered but only 70 passbooks were taken out, Kgosi Moiloa was deposed a week later. His banishment order was revoked on 1 January 1971. Today, in acknowledgment of his contributions to the struggle for democracy the local municipality bears his name.

Main places
The 2001 census divided the municipality into the following main places:

Politics 

The municipal council consists of thirty-eight members elected by mixed-member proportional representation. Nineteen councillors are elected by first-past-the-post voting in nineteen wards, while the remaining nineteen are chosen from party lists so that the total number of party representatives is proportional to the number of votes received. In the election of 1 November 2021 the African National Congress (ANC) won a majority of twenty-three seats on the council.
The following table shows the results of the election.

References

External links 
 Official site

Local municipalities of the Ngaka Modiri Molema District Municipality